Cotinis beraudi is a species of Cotinis scarab.

References

Cetoniinae
Beetles of North America
Beetles described in 1998